Narrow Margin is a 1990 American neo-noir action thriller film written and directed by Peter Hyams, loosely based on the 1952 film noir The Narrow Margin. The film stars Gene Hackman and Anne Archer, with James Sikking, J. T. Walsh, and M. Emmet Walsh in supporting roles. It tells the story of a Los Angeles deputy district attorney who attempts to keep a murder witness safe from hit men while traveling through the Canadian wilderness aboard a train.

Narrow Margin was produced by Carolco Pictures, and filmed on location in Alberta and British Columbia, Canada. It was released by TriStar Pictures on September 21, 1990.

Plot 
In Los Angeles, divorced editor Carol Hunnicut is on a blind date in a hotel restaurant with widowed lawyer Michael Tarlow when a waiter delivers a message for him to phone a client. Tarlow goes to his suite to make the call and invites her to come with him. While Hunnicut watches from a darkened room, the client, crime boss Leo Watts, unexpectedly arrives in person along with a gunman, Jack Wootton. He has learned that Tarlow stole from him, but says Tarlow will not be harmed if he repays the money. Then he adds, "I lied", and Wootton shoots Tarlow dead.

The next day Hunnicut learns that Tarlow was Watts's lawyer, and realizes she is in danger. She delivers her son to his father and urges them to go into hiding, and she flees to a borrowed cabin in the Canadian Rockies, telling only one person where she went and what she saw.

Police sergeant Benti traces Hunnicut and learns these facts, which he brings to deputy district attorney Robert Caulfield. Caulfield is half suspicious of his boss, Martin Larner, for stopping a previous prosecution of Watts because the evidence was insufficient; over Larner's objections, he arranges to go to the cabin by chartered plane and helicopter. There, he urges Hunnicut to return with him and testify, but she refuses. At this point Watts's men arrive in their own helicopter and open fire. Caulfield's pilot and Benti are killed.

Caulfield improvises an escape with Hunnicut, first by road, then off-road into a forest. He sees a VIA Rail train to Vancouver stopping nearby, and manages to reach the station in time. He cons an elderly couple into giving up their drawing room on the train, so he can hide Hunnicut, but he is followed onto the train by Wootton and another of Watts's gunmen, Nelson.

Caulfield repeatedly manages to evade the men and keep them from seeing what Hunnicut looks like. At the next station, he phones his office. Avoiding Larner, he speaks to another deputy DA, James Dahlbeck, to arrange for police to meet the train at the following station. But the "police" turn out to be more of Watts's men, thereby confirming that Dahlbeck is dirty. Caulfield manages to reboard the train, still protecting Hunnicut. Nelson attempts to bribe Caulfield to reveal her, but he refuses.

Another passenger, Kathryn Weller, strikes up an acquaintance with Caulfield and he realizes he must protect her from being mistaken for Hunnicut and killed. As he tries to rush her to safety, another passenger, Keller, is suspicious and reveals himself as a railroad policeman. Caulfield hides Weller with Keller and asks him to pass on a message to Larner that Dahlbeck is in league with Watts, but when he returns from updating Hunnicut, he finds Keller shot dead.

Eventually Caulfield is seen with Hunnicut and they go onto the roof of the train, followed by the gunmen, who both fall off in the ensuing fight. Then Weller climbs on the roof, revealing herself as another assassin, but she faces backwards as she aims her shot, and is swept off the train when it enters a tunnel.

After this, the train is stopped and Caulfield is finally able to phone Larner and tell him what happened. Later, back in Los Angeles, Hunnicut testifies about the murder of Tarlow.

Cast

Production 
Peter Hyams watched the original film on television one night "at some ungodly hour" and thought it was ideal for a remake.

"I didn't think the movie was terrific, but I thought the idea of people being stuck on a train was wonderful," said Hyams. "It harkened back to the kind of movie they don't make anymore. The idea of a train is very mysterious and romantic."

Hyams got Paramount to buy the rights to the original RKO film and set about writing the adaptation. He felt the train in his film should be traveling through country "so forbidding that you can't just jump off and go to a rent-a-car counter" so he decided to set the action in Mexico or Canada. "So I took the train through the Rockies and was unprepared for how beautiful it is," said Hyams. "It was the most extraordinary scenery I've ever seen." So he decided on Canada.

Lead roles went to Gene Hackman and Anne Archer. Hackman said, "Peter and I have talked about doing a film vaguely a number of times over the years and this came along and he told me that Anne was going to be involved. It's a good action-thriller. It has a lot of nice character to it."

The film was shot in British Columbia and Alberta, Canada in June 1989.

The train used for both interior and exterior scenes consisted of a BC Rail SD40-2 diesel locomotive and 12 privately owned passenger railcars, all painted in Via Rail Canada livery to represent the Toronto-Vancouver passenger train. Some of the distant exterior shots were filmed using a model train.

Reception 

Cult Cinema writer David Harkin praised the film, suggesting that...'Produced in the late 1980s and released in 1990, arguably during the golden age of the action thriller, Narrow Margin has remained under the radar. The film, however, has much to recommend it; Bruce Broughton’s score, which echoes Michael Small’s work a decade earlier (Marathon Man, The Parallax View), helps move things along as high octane stunts, typical of the era, permeate the climax'

Narrow Margin received mixed reviews. On Rotten Tomatoes, the film holds a rating of 63% based on 16 reviews. Audiences polled by CinemaScore gave the film an average grade of "B+" on an A+ to F scale.

Home media 
The DVD released by Optimum Releasing in 2007 is the only DVD available of Narrow Margin with any kind of extra features; it contains a commentary by Peter Hyams, B-Roll footage, a brief documentary, sound-bites by the cast and crew, and a trailer. All other DVD versions of the movie have been without features.

Kino Lorber released the film on Blu-ray on June 30, 2020 with a new 4K master, containing the previous features from the Optimum DVD and a new commentary from film historian/critic Peter Tonguette.

References

External links 

1990 films
1990 action thriller films
1990 crime thriller films
1990s crime action films
1990s English-language films
American action thriller films
American crime action films
American crime thriller films
American neo-noir films
Carolco Pictures films
Films about lawyers
Films about witness protection
Films directed by Peter Hyams
Films set in Canada
Films set in Los Angeles
Films set on trains
Films shot in Alberta
Films shot in British Columbia
Films scored by Bruce Broughton
Films with screenplays by Peter Hyams
Remakes of American films
TriStar Pictures films
1990s American films